The 2003 South Asian Football Federation Gold Cup was held in Dhaka, Bangladesh between 10 January 2003 and 20 January 2003. All matches were played at the Bangabandhu National Stadium. Originally scheduled to be held between 26 January 2002 and 5 February 2002, the tournament was postponed due to the suspension of Bangladesh Football Federation by FIFA. Afghanistan were not in the draw, but were included in the tournament following the recommendation from AFC to do so. It was also Bhutan's first tournament.

The final was contested by Bangladesh and the Maldives. Ali Umar had levelled in the second half after Kanchan had given Bangladesh the lead. The match went to penalties and Asraf Lufty had missed from the spot for the Maldives. Mohammed Sujan kept his nerve to score the final penalty giving Bangladesh a 5–3 victory, and with it, their first SAFF Cup championship. Pakistan's Safraz Rasool was top goal scorer.

Venue
The Bangabandhu National Stadium in Dhaka was the only venue for the tournament. It is also home venue for Bangladesh national football team.

Squads

Group stage

Group A

Group B

Knockout phase

Bracket

Semi-finals

Third-place match

Final

Champion

Goalscorers

4 goals
 Sarfraz Rasool

3 goals

 Ashim Biswas
 Alvito D'Cunha 
 Rokonuzzaman Kanchan
 Ali Shiyam
 Ali Umar

2 goals

 Ariful Kabir Farhad
 Ashraf Luthfy
 Mohamed Nizam

1 goal 

 Alfaz Ahmed 
 Ibrahim Fazeel 
 Arif Khan Joy 
 Zahid Niaz 
 Motiur Rahman Munna
 I.M. Vijayan
 Abhishek Yadav

External links 
RSSSF 2003 South Asian Football Federation Gold Cup at Rec.Sport.Soccer Statistics Foundation

2003
SAFF
2003
2003 in Asian football
2000s in Dhaka